Chandrokotha is a 2003 Bengali drama film written and directed by Humayun Ahmed. Produced and distributed by Nuhash Chalachitra the film starred Ferdous Ahmed, Meher Afroz Shaon, Asaduzzaman Noor, Champa, Ahmed Rubel, Shadhin Khosru, Dr.Ezazul Islam and Monira Mithu in the lead role. Meher Afroz Shaon and Ahmed Rubel won Best Film Actress and Actor awards in 6th Meril Prothom Alo Awards.

Cast
Ferdous Ahmed as Johir
Meher Afroz Shaon as Chandra
Asaduzzaman Noor as Zaminder Sarkar 
Ahmed Rubel as Amin
Shadhin Khosru as Zaminder's Son
Champa as Madina
Dr.Ezazul Islam as School Teacher
Monira Mithu as Chandra's Mother
Bohota Saha as Joitori
Nazmul Huda Bachchu as Village elder
Dipak Kumar Sur as Village barber

Soundtracks

Accolades

References

External links

Bangladeshi drama films
Films directed by Humayun Ahmed
2003 drama films
2003 films
Bengali-language Bangladeshi films
Films set in the 2000s
Films scored by Maksud Jamil Mintu
2000s Bengali-language films